Erwin Segal is an American academic who an emeritus professor of psychology at the University at Buffalo.

Education 
Segal earned a Bachelor of Arts degree in psychology from the University of Maryland, College Park and a PhD in psychology from the University of Minnesota.

Career 
As a PhD student, Segal also worked as an instructor at the University of Minnesota. He later worked as an assistant professor at the State College of Iowa and Arlington State College. He joined SUNY Buffalo in 1967. He is best known for his book with Garvin McCain on the philosophy of science The Game of Science  (5th ed, 1988). His recent research efforts have been in cognitive psychology, in particular narrative comprehension and problem solving, working in the Center for Cognitive Science at SUNY Buffalo.

References 

American cognitive scientists
Living people
Year of birth missing (living people)

University at Buffalo faculty
University of Maryland, College Park alumni
University of Minnesota alumni